Cartes is a municipality located in the autonomous community of Cantabria, Spain. According to the 2009 census, the city has a population of 5.118 inhabitants.

References

External links
Cartes - Cantabria 102 Municipios

Municipalities in Cantabria